Watertown High School (WHS) is a public high school located in Watertown, Jefferson County, New York, U.S.A., and is the only high school operated by the Watertown City School District.

References

External links

Watertown City School District website

Schools in Jefferson County, New York
Public high schools in New York (state)
School buildings in Watertown, New York